K. C. Seth was an Anglican bishop: he was the fourth bishop of North Kerala.

References

 Church of South India clergy
 Anglican bishops of North Kerala
20th-century Anglican bishops